Statistics of Bahraini Premier League in season 1984–85.

Overview
It was contested by 9 teams, and Bahrain won the championship.

League standings

References
Bahrain - List of final tables (RSSSF)

Bahraini Premier League seasons
Bah
1984–85 in Bahraini football